Natalia de Luccas (born September 13, 1996) is a Brazilian swimmer.

International career

2013–16
She competed at the 2013 FINA World Junior Swimming Championships, in Dubai, United Arab Emirates, where she finished fifth in the 4×100 m freestyle relay, 10th in the 4×100 m medley relay, 10th in the mixed 4×100 m medley relay, 10th in the 100 m backstroke, 12th in the 100 m freestyle, 17th in the 200 m backstroke, and 19th in the 50 m backstroke.

On 5 December 2013, at the Júlio Delamare Trophy held in Rio de Janeiro, she broke the South American record in the 200 m backstroke, with a time of 2:12.09.

At the 2014 South American Games in Santiago, Chile, she won two bronze medals in the 100 m backstroke and in the 200 m backstroke.

At the 2014 Summer Youth Olympics in Nanjing, she won a silver medal in the mixed 4×100 m freestyle relay. She also finished fourth in the 100 m backstroke, fourth in the mixed 4×100 m medley relay, fifth in the 4×100 m freestyle relay, 10th in the 50 m backstroke and 16th in the 200 m backstroke.

At the 2015 Pan American Games in Toronto, Canada, she won a bronze medal in the 4×100 m medley relay, by participating at heats. She also finished ninth in the 100 m backstroke.

2016 Summer Olympics
At the 2016 Summer Olympics, she competed in the Women's 4 × 100 metre medley relay, finishing 13th.

References

Brazilian female backstroke swimmers
1996 births
Living people
People from Limeira
Swimmers at the 2015 Pan American Games
Swimmers at the 2014 Summer Youth Olympics
Pan American Games bronze medalists for Brazil
Swimmers at the 2016 Summer Olympics
Olympic swimmers of Brazil
Pan American Games medalists in swimming
South American Games bronze medalists for Brazil
South American Games medalists in swimming
Competitors at the 2014 South American Games
Medalists at the 2015 Pan American Games
Sportspeople from São Paulo (state)
21st-century Brazilian women